Roddy Alberto Zambrano Olmedo (born 3 February 1978) is an Ecuadorian professional football referee. He has been a full international for FIFA since 2012. He refereed matches in Copa Libertadores and at the 2019 Copa America.

References 

1978 births
Living people
Ecuadorian football referees
People from Manabí Province
Copa América referees